Drafa or Drapha may refer to :

 Drafa State, a former princely state in Western Kathiawar (Gujarat)
 Drafa Plague, a fictional disease